The Confederación Unitaria de Trabajadores del Perú (CUT) is a national trade union center in Peru. It was founded in 1992 and has a membership of 300,000.

ICTUR reports that the CUT was active in the movement that led to Alberto Fujimori fleeing from office in 2000.

The CUT is affiliated with the International Trade Union Confederation.

References

Trade unions in Peru
International Trade Union Confederation
Trade unions established in 1992